Wild West is a studio album by American country music artist Dottie West, released in 1981.

This was one of Dottie West's best-selling albums as a solo artist. The album reached not only the No. 5 spot on the "Top Country Albums" chart but also reached No. 78 on the "Billboard 200". The boasted two no. 1 Billboard country hits for West, "Are You Happy Baby" and the biggest single of her career, a duet Kenny Rogers (uncredited, except on promo copies), "What Are We Doin' in Love". The latter song was also No. 14 on the Pop charts and no. 7 on the Adult Contemporary charts, West's highest ranking by far on either chart.  Another single spawned from this same album, titled "(I'm Gonna) Put You Back on the Rack", which reached the Top 20 on both the Billboard and Cashbox Country charts.

The back cover photo of the album featured West wearing her infamous Spandex pants. This is one of West's best-known albums in all of her career.  The front and back photos were by renowned Hollywood photographer Harry Langdon who subsequently shot the album covers for all of West's 1981-84 albums on Liberty Records.

Track listing
All tracks composed by Randy Goodrum and Brent Maher; except where indicated

Personnel
Dottie West - vocals
Jon Goin, Bruce Dees - guitar
Sonny Garrish - steel guitar
Jack Williams, Bob Wray - bass
Shane Keister - keyboards
Randy Goodrum - piano
Pete Bordonali - mandolin
Kenny Malone - drums, percussion
Terry McMillan - harmonica
The Sheldon Kurland Strings - strings
Sheri Kramer, Donna McElroy, Bergen White - backing vocals

Charts

Weekly charts

Year-end charts

Singles

References

1981 albums
Dottie West albums
Liberty Records albums
United Artists Records albums
Albums produced by Brent Maher